Powers is a village in Menominee County in the U.S. state of Michigan. The population was 422 at the 2010 census. Located within Spalding Township, it is part of the Marinette micropolitan area.

History
At an early date, the place was  called Menominee River Junction because here was the junction between the main line and the Menominee River Branch. The origin of the name Powers is uncertain. Several sources claim the village was named after Edward Powers, a civil engineer involved in building the railroad there. Edward Powers afterwards became notorious as a professed "rain maker." Another source claims the village was founded in 1872 and named after Tom Powers, an engineer for the Chicago & North Western Railroad.

Geography

Powers is located at the merger of U.S. Route 2 and U.S. Route 41.  The Cedar River flows briefly through the northern portion of the village.

Demographics

2010 census
As of the census of 2010, there were 422 people, 135 households, and 63 families living in the village. The racial makeup of the village was 98.3% White, 0.9% Native American, 0.2% Asian, and 0.5% from other races. Hispanic or Latino of any race were 0.9% of the population.

There were 135 households, of which 22.2% had children under the age of 18 living with them, 35.6% were married couples living together, 8.9% had a female householder with no husband present, 2.2% had a male householder with no wife present, and 53.3% were non-families. 48.9% of all households were made up of individuals, and 26.7% had someone living alone who was 65 years of age or older. The average household size was 1.94 and the average family size was 2.90.

The median age in the village was 65.1 years. 11.4% of residents were under the age of 18; 5.3% were between the ages of 18 and 24; 16.1% were from 25 to 44; 17.1% were from 45 to 64; and 50.2% were 65 years of age or older. The gender makeup of the village was 41.5% male and 58.5% female.

2000 census
As of the census of 2000, there were 430 people, 124 households, and 59 families living in the village. The racial makeup of the village was 97.67% White, 0.47% Native American, and 1.86% from two or more races.

There were 124 households, out of which 14.5% had children under the age of 18 living with them, 40.3% were married couples living together, 5.6% had a female householder with no husband present, and 52.4% were non-families. 45.2% of all households were made up of individuals, and 28.2% had someone living alone who was 65 years of age or older.  The average household size was 2.08 and the average family size was 2.85.

In the village, the population was spread out, with 9.5% under the age of 18, 5.6% from 18 to 24, 13.7% from 25 to 44, 16.7% from 45 to 64, and 54.4% who were 65 years of age or older.  The median age was 68 years. For every 100 females, there were 62.3 males.  For every 100 females age 18 and over, there were 60.1 males.

The median income for a household in the village was $20,250, and the median income for a family was $36,250. Males had a median income of $25,000 versus $20,625 for females. The per capita income for the village was $14,207.  About 14.6% of families and 17.9% of the population were below the poverty line, including 19.0% of those under age 18 and 24.2% of those age 65 or over.

References

Villages in Michigan
Villages in Menominee County, Michigan
Populated places established in 1872
1872 establishments in Michigan
Marinette micropolitan area